Gonçalo Jardim Brandão (born 9 October 1986) is a Portuguese former professional footballer. Mainly a central defender, he also appeared as a left back.

Club career

Belenenses
A product of hometown C.F. Os Belenenses' academy, Lisbon-born Brandão scored in his second match in the Primeira Liga aged 17, against FC Porto in a 1–4 home loss on 18 October 2003 when he still had not finished his youth career. He only managed another seven first-team appearances over the next three seasons, with a loan to Charlton Athletic in 2005–06 in between (no Premier League games played).

Brandão played his first league match after his Belenenses return on 4 February 2007, in a 1–0 away win over Vitória F.C. where he started.

Siena
In June 2008, it was announced Brandão had signed a four-year contract with Serie A's A.C. Siena. After a shaky start – he only made his league debut on 20 December in a 1–2 home defeat to Inter Milan– he finished his first season as a starter.

After the end of the 2009–10 campaign, Brandão was loaned to Juventus F.C. for the United States tour along with Albin Ekdal (owned by Juve and loaned to Siena) and three other players.

Parma
On 22 June 2011, after contributing only two games to Siena's top-flight return, Brandão signed for Parma F.C. on loan. In the following summer, the clubs were involved in a player-only transaction which saw Parma sign Brandão, Alessandro Iacobucci, Giuseppe Pacini and Andrea Rossi, while Siena acquired Manuel Coppola, Paolo Hernán Dellafiore, Abdou Doumbia and Alberto Galuppo – both organisations also retained 50% registration rights on their players.

Brandão left for Serie B club A.C. Cesena on 7 July 2012, as Marco Parolo moved to Parma in a temporary deal for €1 million, with the latter side also being responsible of €1.8 million in wages. In the ensuing off-season, still owned by both Parma and Siena, he signed for Romanian club CFR Cluj along with Denilson Gabionetta.

Belenenses return
On 6 January 2014, Brandão returned to Portugal and Belenenses in a temporary deal. On 20 June he was sold back to Siena, with Galuppo returning to Parma. However, the Italians declared their liquidation on 15 July as the club did not meet the financial requirements for the upcoming season, and the player re-joined Belenenses as a free agent.

International career
After having represented Portugal at every youth level, including the under-21s, Brandão made his debut for the full side on 31 March 2009, appearing as a left back in a 2–0 friendly victory against South Africa in Lausanne, Switzerland.

Club statistics

References

External links

1986 births
Living people
Portuguese footballers
Footballers from Lisbon
Association football defenders
Primeira Liga players
Liga Portugal 2 players
C.F. Os Belenenses players
G.D. Estoril Praia players
FC Porto B players
Charlton Athletic F.C. players
Serie A players
Serie B players
A.C.N. Siena 1904 players
Parma Calcio 1913 players
A.C. Cesena players
Liga I players
CFR Cluj players
Swiss Challenge League players
FC Lausanne-Sport players
Portugal youth international footballers
Portugal under-21 international footballers
Portugal international footballers
Portuguese expatriate footballers
Expatriate footballers in England
Expatriate footballers in Italy
Expatriate footballers in Romania
Expatriate footballers in Switzerland
Portuguese expatriate sportspeople in England
Portuguese expatriate sportspeople in Italy
Portuguese expatriate sportspeople in Romania
Portuguese expatriate sportspeople in Switzerland